

This is a list of the National Register of Historic Places listings in Roane County, Tennessee.

This is intended to be a complete list of the properties and historic districts  in Roane County, Tennessee, United States, that are listed on the National Register of Historic Places.  Latitude and longitude coordinates are provided for many National Register properties and districts; these locations may be seen together in a map.

There are 20 properties and districts listed on the National Register in the county, including one National Historic Landmark.

See also National Register of Historic Places listings in Anderson County, Tennessee for additional properties in Oak Ridge and Oliver Springs, cities that span the county line.

Current listings

|}

See also

 List of National Historic Landmarks in Tennessee
 National Register of Historic Places listings in Tennessee

References

Roane
 
Buildings and structures in Roane County, Tennessee